Bogambara Stadium is a multi-purpose stadium in Kandy, Sri Lanka It is one of the oldest grounds in the country. Stadium is currently used mostly for Rugby matches and hosted the games of the Singer Sri Lankan Airlines Rugby 7's. It has a capacity of 30,000.

Early history

In 1897 the grounds were converted from a lake to a playing field. At one time it was the site for carnivals, games circuses and gymkhana activities and even an execution ground during the British occupation. A number of sporting clubs including Kandy Sports Club, Young's Stars SC, Young Wanders SC, Green Field SC and schools including St. Anthony's, Trinity College, Sri Rahula College, St. Paul's (now known as Sri Sumangala College), Dharmaraja College and Kingswood College used the venue to conduct cricket, football, rugby, hockey and athletics. Bogambara Stadium was not only used for sports, it was also used for folk sports including elle, bahu, thattu and gudu.

Sports
Bogambara Stadium serves as a venue for various sports, including rugby, football, hockey, athletics, netball, basketball, softball, and cricket.

Stadium development

Bogambara Stadium was renovated into a stadium in 1972, thanks to the Special Commissionership of M. B. Samarakoon, who initiated the renovation work with support from local politicians such as E. L. Senanayake, Noel Wimalasena, Shelton Ranaraja, and E. W. Balasuriya, a local sports promoter and philanthropist, who assisted in raising donations. In 1997 the Bogambara stadium was upgraded to an international standard stadium, at a cost of Rs. 89 million, with 75% of the funding coming from the Kandy District Sports Development Foundation, chaired by Anuruddha Ratwatte, the Deputy Minister of Defence. It was re-developed under the patronage of the municipal council and presently the Sports Ministry owns the premises. The ground fees are on the higher side and the less affluent football and hockey clubs are finding it difficult to keep the game alive.

Major events
Bradby Shield Encounter
Singer Sri Lankan Airlines Rugby 7's
L.E. Blaze Trophy - Kingswood Vs Wesley

References

(2006) Tikiri enthusiastic in promoting sports Colombo: The Morning Leader

External links
 The Morning Leader

Sport in Kandy
Football venues in Sri Lanka
Buildings and structures in Kandy
Sports venues in Central Province, Sri Lanka